Trypimeni is a small village in the Famagusta District of Cyprus, located  north of Marathovounos on the south side of the Kyrenia mountain range. It is under the de facto control of Northern Cyprus.

References

Communities in Famagusta District
Populated places in Gazimağusa District